Mark Andrew Mathias (born August 2, 1994) is an American professional baseball infielder for the Pittsburgh Pirates of Major League Baseball (MLB). He has previously played in MLB for the Milwaukee Brewers and Texas Rangers.

Career

Amateur career
Mathias attended Irvington High School in Fremont, California. Undrafted out of high school, Mathias attended California Polytechnic State University. Mathias played for the 2014 USA Collegiate National Team. He underwent arthroscopic shoulder surgery in December 2014.

Cleveland Indians
The Cleveland Indians selected Mathias in the third round of the 2015 Major League Baseball draft.

Mathias played for the Mahoning Valley Scrappers in 2015, hitting .282/.382/.408/.790 with 2 home run and 32 RBI. He split the 2016 season between the Lynchburg Hillcats and the Akron RubberDucks, hitting a combined .267/.351/.396/.747 with 5 home runs and 61 RBI. He spent the 2017 and 2018 season in Akron, hitting .212 in 35 games in 2017, and .232 with 8 home runs and 45 RBI in 2018. He spent the 2019 season with the Columbus Clippers, hitting .269/.355/.442/.797 with 12 home runs and 59 RBI.

Milwaukee Brewers
Cleveland traded Mathias to the Milwaukee Brewers in exchange for Andres Melendez on November 20, 2019, and the Brewers added him to their 40-man roster.

Mathias made his MLB debut on August 4, 2020 as a pinch runner. On March 16, 2021, Mathias was placed on the 60-day injured list due to a torn labrum in his shoulder. On November 19, 2021, Mathias was outrighted off of the 40-man roster and sent to Triple-A. 

On May 24, 2022, his contract was selected from Triple-A Nashville. On June 11, Mathias hit his first career home run, a two-run shot off of Patrick Corbin of the Washington Nationals.

Texas Rangers
On August 1, 2022, Mathias and pitcher Antoine Kelly were traded to the Texas Rangers in exchange for pitcher Matt Bush. Mathias played in 24 games with Texas in 2022, hitting .277/.365/.554 with 5 home runs and 16 RBI. On March 4, 2023, Mathias was designated for assignment by the Rangers after the signing of Will Smith was made official.

Pittsburgh Pirates
On March 8, 2023, Mathias was traded to the Pittsburgh Pirates in exchange for Ricky DeVito.

References

External links

1994 births
Living people
Sportspeople from Santa Clara, California
Baseball players from California
Major League Baseball infielders
Milwaukee Brewers players
Texas Rangers players
Cal Poly Mustangs baseball players
Mahoning Valley Scrappers players
Lynchburg Hillcats players
Akron RubberDucks players
Columbus Clippers players
Nashville Sounds players
Round Rock Express players